John Johnston (1809 – 16 November 1887) was a Member of the New Zealand Legislative Council and a successful businessman.

Biography
Johnston was born in Ayrshire south-west Scotland in 1809. In 1838, he married Henrietta Charlotte Hatton, who was a devout Roman Catholic. He arrived with his family in Wellington from London via Nelson on 3 January 1843 on the Prince of Wales. He travelled with his wife, their two sons Walter Woods and Sydney and their daughter Agnes Mary who was born during the journey. He was a Freemason and of Presbyterian faith, but his children were brought up in their mother's Catholic faith.

In the early 1840s, he founded the large mercantile house and stock and station agency known as Johnston and Co. and continued to take an active part until 1878, when he retired from business, leaving the company in the hands of his sons: the Hon. Walter Woods Johnston who, like his father, was an ex-Minister, and the Hon. Charles Johnston, M.L.C. Johnston also held land in Wellington and the lower North Island where he built the house at Oruawharo for Sydney, his second son who took charge of these holdings (Percival Sydney Johnston 1841–1917). His residence was in Fitzherbert Terrace Thorndon.

Johnston was a member of the Wellington Provincial Council between December 1855 and April 1872. He first represented the Wellington Country electorate, and since 1865 he was a member for Karori and Mākara. At various times (1858, 1861–1862, 1868), he was a member of the Wellington Executive Council.  Johnston was appointed to the Legislative Council on 31 March 1857 and served until 6 November 1860, when his membership lapsed through absence. He was reappointed on 11 March 1861 and remained a member for the rest of his life. Johnston was prominent as a legislator for many years. Johnston was a member of the Executive Council in the Stafford Ministry, from 14 May 1866 until 5 April 1867.

His eldest daughter, Agnes Mary, married Morgan Stanislaus Grace on 25 January 1866 at Wellington. His third daughter, Jessie Mary, married Westby Perceval on 11 May 1880 at Wellington.

Henrietta Johnston died on 23 February 1878. He died on 16 November 1887 at Wellington, aged 76 years, and was buried three days later. At his death, his property was estimated to be worth £1,000,000.

Notes

References
 This article incorporates text from a publication now in the public domain: 

1809 births
1887 deaths
New Zealand stock and station agents
Members of the New Zealand Legislative Council
People from Wellington City
Members of the Wellington Provincial Council
19th-century New Zealand politicians
John